Children is an album by David Murray released on the Italian Black Saint label in 1984. It features performances by Murray, guitarist James "Blood" Ulmer, keyboardist Don Pullen, bassist Lonnie Plaxico and drummer Marvin "Smitty" Smith.

According to Chris Kelsey, in his Allmusic essay "Free Jazz: A Subjective History", Children is one of the 20 Essential Free Jazz Albums.

Reception
The Allmusic review by Scott Yanow awarded the album 4 stars, stating, "The somewhat noisy performances are pretty spontaneous and, thanks to Pullen's rhythmic style, a little more accessible than one might expect, despite being quite adventurous.".

Track listing
 "David's Tune" – 11:43  
 "Death" – 7:15  
 "All the Things You Are" (Oscar Hammerstein II, Jerome Kern) – 14:54  
 "Tension" – 8:17 
All compositions by David Murray except as indicated
Recorded at Vanguard Studios, NYC, October 27 and November 15, 1984

Personnel
David Murray – tenor saxophone, bass clarinet
James Blood Ulmer – guitar
Don Pullen – piano
Lonnie Plaxico – bass
Marvin "Smitty" Smith – percussion

References

1984 albums
David Murray (saxophonist) albums
Black Saint/Soul Note albums